Silvio Pettirossi Pereira (June 16, 1887 – October 17, 1916) was a Paraguayan airplane pilot and aviation pioneer.

Background

Born in Asunción  on June 16, 1887 to Italian immigrant parents. As a young man he firstly moved to Spoleto in Italy where he attended a military school, then to Buenos Aires where he became acquainted with the aviator Jorge Newbery who taught him how to fly.

Aviation achievements

In 1912, Pettirossi received a scholarship from the Paraguayan government and moved to France where he obtained the title of aviator pilot from the international aeronautic federation. After receiving the title he made many important flights, one of which was a record eight-hour flight.

He bought a Deperdussin model "T" monoplane with a 60 HP rotary Gnome engine. He made many famous and extraordinary acrobatic flights in Europe, South America and the United States.

In December 1914 he founded the Aeroclub del Paraguay and served as its first president.

Death, and legacy

On October 17, 1916, while doing an inverted loop, the left wing of his plane broke, and the aircraft crashed to the ground in a ranch owned by the Castell family, in Punta Lara, Buenos Aires Province. Pettirossi died instantly.

Asunción's Silvio Pettirossi International Airport, three football clubs, the Airborne Brigade of the Paraguayan Air Force, a Paraguayan Air Force Base in Luque, an avenue in Asunción, the Paraguayan Institute of Aviation History, a school, and some other places are named after him.

References

 Sapienza, Antonio Luis: La Contribución Italiana en la Aviación Paraguaya. Author's edition. Asunción. 2007. 

1887 births
1916 deaths
Paraguayan aviators
Aviators killed in aviation accidents or incidents in Argentina
Paraguayan people of Italian descent
People from Asunción
Aviation pioneers
Aviation record holders
Victims of aviation accidents or incidents in 1916